The men's triple jump at the 2012 African Championships in Athletics was held at the Stade Charles de Gaulle on 30 June.

Medalists

Records

Schedule

Results

Final

References

Results

Triple jump Men
Triple jump at the African Championships in Athletics